NCWC may refer to:

National Council of Women of Canada, a Canadian advocacy organization based in Ottawa, Ontario
North Carolina Wesleyan College, a private Methodist liberal arts college in Rocky Mount, North Carolina
National Catholic Welfare Council, formerly the annual meeting of the American Catholic hierarchy and its standing secretariat
 National Catholic Welfare Council Press Department, which later became the Catholic News Service